Canacona is a city and a municipal council in the district of South Goa, Goa state, India. Canacona taluka includes Patnem, Chaudi, Poinguinim, Loliem-Polem, Agonda, and Gaumdongre. Chaudi is the headquarters and the most developed town in this taluka. The famous Palolem Beach is located in Canacona.

Geography
It has an average elevation of 10 metres (32 feet). Canacona is the southernmost taluka of Goa.

History 

The historical name of Canacona is "Kanvapura"

Education 
Dnyna Prabodhini Mandal's Shree Mallikarjun College of Arts & Commerce located at Delem Canacona Goa.  Affiliated to Goa University, is the prime educational institute of this taluka catering to higher educational needs of the area.
There are two higher Secondaries in Canacona.

Demographics
 India census, Canacona city had a population of 12,434. Males constitute 52% of the population and females 48%. Canacona has an average literacy rate of 89.31%, higher than the national average of 74.04%; with male literacy of 93.09% and female literacy of 85.47%. 10% of the population is under 6 years of age. In addition to Konkani, Marathi is also spoken here by a minority.

Government and politics
Canacona is part of Canacona (Goa Assembly constituency) and South Goa (Lok Sabha constituency).

References

External links

Cities and towns in South Goa district